Mountain Creek can refer to one of the following:

United States 
Mountain Creek, Chilton, Alabama 
Mountain Creek, a ski resort located in Vernon Township, New Jersey
Mountain Creek Waterpark, a waterpark originally operating under the name Action Park from 1978 to 1996 and from 2014 to 2016.
Mountain Creek, a tributary of Swabia Creek, Macungie, Pennsylvania
Mountain Creek (Georges Creek tributary), a stream in Fayette County, Pennsylvania
Mountain Creek Lake, a reservoir in Dallas, Texas
Mountain Creek Lake Bridge, an eponymous bridge
Mountain Creek, North Texas

Australia 
Mountain Creek, Queensland, a suburb in Maroochy Shire on the Sunshine Coast in Queensland, Australia
Mountain Creek State High School